Carabinere was a  of the Italian Regia Marina (Royal Navy) The ship was laid down on 7 November 1905 at the Ansaldo shipyard in Genoa. She was launched on 12 October 1909 and completed on 26 January 1910. She was reclassified as a torpedo boat on 1 July 1921 and discarded on 7 May 1925.

Design 
Carabiniere was powered by two sets of triple expansion steam engines fed by three Thornycroft water-tube boilers and driving two propeller shafts. The 1909 version could reach speeds . The two expansion engines could produce an estimated .

Armaments 
The ship was fitted with four /40 calibre guns and three  torpedo tubes.

References

Bibliography
 

Soldato-class destroyers
Destroyers of the Regia Marina
World War I naval ships of Italy
1909 ships